Jordanian–Syrian border incidents during the Syrian Civil War refers to violent incidents on the arid  Jordan–Syria border over the course of the Syrian Civil War.

The Raytheon defence company has provided the Jordanian Armed Forces with a high-tech security system (not a wall) stretching across the wide borders between the two countries. The security system has enabled the Jordanian border patrol units to discover and deal with several border infiltrations. The system detects the movement of militias before reaching Jordanian territory and the army issues warnings to the infiltrators and when the warnings go ignored, they are exterminated, according to established rules of engagement.

Jordan says that drug smuggling attempts have increased three-fold since the start of the Syrian civil war. All infiltration attempts have been foiled.

Overview
Overview as of 17 March 2017.

Timeline

2012
In October 2012, Islamic militants attempted to infiltrate Jordan from Syria during the Syrian civil war. One militant was severely injured and 4 were killed, the clash resulted in the death of one Jordanian soldier, the first Jordanian military personnel to be killed during the Syrian civil war. 13 IS members involved were arrested while the rest retreated back to Syrian territory.

2014

On 16 April 2014, the Jordanian Air Force bombed a convoy of vehicles on the Syrian-Jordanian border. Reportedly, the airstrike took place when the convoy attempted to penetrate the Jordanian border from Syria.

Though Syrian involvement was proposed, a Syrian military official said the vehicles did not belong to the Syrian army. A Jordanian security source said the targets appeared to have been Syrian rebels with machine guns mounted on civilian vehicles who were seeking refuge from fighting with government forces in southern Syria.

2016
On 23 January, a total of 36 armed men tried to infiltrate the border and an engagement with Jordanian border patrol left 12 dead infiltrators while the rest retreated back into Syria. They were found to have 2 million drug pills. The spokesperson also stated that "Jordan will not tolerate any infiltration attempt and will strike with an iron fist to whoever tries to disrupt Jordanian national security".

On 25 January, two armed men tried to infiltrate the borders and were exterminated. They were found to have 2600 palm-sized bags of marijuana and 2.4 million Captagon pills.

On 7 February, two men exploited the foggy weather conditions and tried to infiltrate. They were exterminated, according to rules of engagement, according to the Jordan Armed Forces spokesperson. The spokesperson warned that anyone trying to infiltrate will face the same fate.

On 24 February, two vehicles exploited the foggy weather and attempted to infiltrate, an engagement with the border patrols left 1 dead and 6 injured which were taken into custody.

On the dawn of 21 June, a booby-trapped car exploded near a Jordanian Armed Forces outpost in the extreme north-eastern point of Rukban, a remote makeshift Syrian refugee camp. The attack left 6 dead and 14 injured Jordanian soldiers. As a result of the incident, the Jordan-Syria border has been declared as a "closed military zone". Jordanian minister of foreign affairs Nasser Judeh said in a press conference "we don't need a hideous terrorist attack like this one to prove to the world the legitimacy of our security concerns".

The country has also stated that it will halt the expansion or construction of refugee camps. Following the incident, delivery of humanitarian aid to the area was stopped due to increased security concerns. Only one food delivery was allowed since the attack, however water delivery resumed two weeks following the incident. As of September 2016, around 75,000 Syrian refugees are stranded in the Rukban area under extremely poor living conditions. Due to the lack of access to medical care and clean water, the spread of diseases has increased and as a result disease-related deaths.

On 8 September 2016, a vehicle that was trying to infiltrate into Jordan was destroyed by the Jordanian border guards while it was still in Syrian territory.

3 infiltrators were killed as they approached the Jordanian borders from Syria on 27 October 2016.

2017
A car explosion on 22 January 2017 at the Rukban refugee camp caused 11 deaths among Syrian refugees.

Seven individuals attempted to cross the border on 17 March 2017, an engagement with the border guards killed three while the rest retreated back to Syria. They were found to have large amounts of narcotics.

An infiltration attempt was foiled on 27 March 2017, ended in the death of 3. The army reported that they were trying to smuggle drugs.

Jordanian F-16 fighter jets downed an unidentified drone on 11 May 2017, near the joint borders with Syria.

Three militants on motorbikes attempted to target a Jordanian border outpost in Rukban on 3 June 2017. They were all killed, while a Jordanian soldier suffered an arm injury.

9 vehicles were destroyed and 5 infiltrators were killed on 11 June.

Border guards killed 2 infiltrators on 22 August.

2018

Statistics
A report by the Jordanian Armed Forces command claimed that during 2015, border guard patrols foiled 85 infiltration attempts involving 132 people. Infiltrating vehicles that did not meet engagement rules and were not exterminated, were found to have 1,473 pieces of various weapons, 6,659 bullets,  16,768,684 Captagon pills, 893,060 palm-sized sheets of marijuana and 20,000 tramadol pills. The drugs were later destroyed at an anti-narcotics department in Amman.

See also

 Jordan–Syria border
 Rukban

References

Spillover of the Syrian civil war
Jordan–Syria relations
2012 in the Syrian civil war
2014 in the Syrian civil war
2016 in the Syrian civil war
2012 in Jordan
2014 in Jordan
2016 in Jordan
Jordanian involvement in the Syrian civil war
Conflicts in 2012
Conflicts in 2013
Conflicts in 2014
Conflicts in 2015
Conflicts in 2016
Conflicts in 2017
Conflicts in 2018
Terrorist incidents in Jordan
Terrorist incidents in Jordan in the 2010s